Sir Rodric Quentin Braithwaite,  (born 17 May 1932) is a retired British diplomat and an author.

Public life
Braithwaite was educated at Bedales School and Christ's College, Cambridge.

After his military service, he joined HM Diplomatic Service in 1955. His diplomatic career included posts in Indonesia, Italy, Poland, the Soviet Union, and a number of positions at the Foreign and Commonwealth Office.

From 1988 to 1992 Braithwaite was ambassador in Moscow, first of all under Margaret Thatcher to the Soviet Union and then under John Major to the Russian Federation.

Subsequently, he was the Prime Minister's foreign policy adviser and chairman of the UK Joint Intelligence Committee (1992–93), and was awarded the GCMG in 1994.

Books

Personal life
Braithwaite was married in April 1961 to the former Gillian Mary Robinson (15 September 1937 – 10 November 2008 London), better known as the archaeologist and Roman face pottery expert Jill Braithwaite. They had several children, including three sons and one daughter - Richard, Katharine, Julian (whose twin brother, Mark, died in 1971) and David.

References

British Diplomatic Oral History Programme
Rodric Braithwaite. Jill Braithwaite obituary 3 December 2008.

External links
Interview with Sir Rodric Quentin Braithwaite & transcript, British Diplomatic Oral History Programme, Churchill College, Cambridge, 1998

1932 births
Living people
People educated at Bedales School
Alumni of Christ's College, Cambridge
Knights Grand Cross of the Order of St Michael and St George
Ambassadors of the United Kingdom to Russia
Ambassadors of the United Kingdom to the Soviet Union
Chairs of the Joint Intelligence Committee (United Kingdom)
Members of HM Diplomatic Service
Rodric
20th-century British diplomats